Berkay Can Değirmencioğlu (born 12 January 1993) is a Turkish footballer who plays as a central defender for Çorum.

Değirmencioğlu has represented the Turkish Football Federation at the U20 and U21 levels.

References

External links

1993 births
People from Osmangazi
People from Bursa
Living people
Turkish footballers
Turkey youth international footballers
Turkey under-21 international footballers
Association football midfielders
Fenerbahçe S.K. footballers
Denizlispor footballers
Ankaraspor footballers
Kayserispor footballers
Karşıyaka S.K. footballers
Şanlıurfaspor footballers
Bandırmaspor footballers
Sakaryaspor footballers
TFF First League players
TFF Second League players